Luigi "Gino" Castiglioni (born April 8, 1967 in San Severo, Apulia) is a former professional boxer from Italy, who won the silver medal at the 1991 European Amateur Boxing Championships in Gothenburg, Sweden. In the final of the light flyweight (– 48 kg) he was defeated by Bulgaria's Ivailo Marinov. Castiglione competed at the 1992 Barcelona Olympics, but was eliminated in his first bout.  He turned professional in 1993, and retired in 2002.

1992 Olympic results

 Round of 32: lost to Dong-Bum Cho (South Korea) on points, 2-8.

References

 BoxingRecords

1967 births
Living people
People from San Severo
Flyweight boxers
Boxers at the 1992 Summer Olympics
Olympic boxers of Italy
Italian male boxers
Sportspeople from the Province of Foggia